Kalgachia is a sub-urban town in Barpeta district, Assam, India.

History
It is not clear when the village was established, but a few official document states that the village was established in the 16th century. It is believed that due to the large population of Kal Gaach (Banana tree), the name has become Kalgachia (meaning place where banana trees are found).The name of this village was Kalitapara before the settlement of the indigenous Miyas.

The 3rd proposed Kalgachia sub division has been formally declared as 'Kalgachia civil Sub division' of Barpeta district on 1 January 2016 as a new year gift by then-Congress-led state government. The Kalgachia civil Sub division committee had been formed in 1975 and since then the demand was raised to form Kalgachia as civil Sub division. Kalgachia is the center place of Jania LAC from where Fakhruddin Ali Ahmed became a President of India. The proposal was made by sub division committee in June 2015 to form Kalgachia as civil Sub division, presided over by Abdul Khaleque And Secretary Md Muzzamel Hussain (Former Assam Public Service Commission Member),

Demography
The total population is 29,000 where 17,000 are male and 12,000 are female as per 2011 census.

Education
Nabajyoti college is the higher educational institution and G K Arabic college madrassa higher educational institution in Kalgachia. There are many private institutions in this place. Ataur Rahman College of Education  and B.B. College are another two institutions of close to this town. Epitome Computer Institute is the oldest and only certified computer education establishment[] and A large number of good quality of English Medium School are Al-Ameen Academy. K.K.Pathak high school is one of the oldest schools of this town. There is new college started (2018) named Ajmal College of Arts & Science. Kalgachia Commerce College is the only commerce college of this town but this college is shifted to Dewkura. There is only one private institution of commerce in present that is Wisdom Academy Kalgachia (A Junior College of Commerce). It has been established only for women's education that is Lokpriya Girls College, located in Dimapur.   Some private sector schools of this town are Radiance Academy, Royal Global English School.[], Fakaruddin Ali Ahmed junior college, Eden Academy and Assam Techno School.

Transport and communication
Kalgachia is located 14 km south of National Highway 27 and well connected by road with Sarbhog and nearby towns. The nearest railway station is Sorbhog Railway Station and the nearest airport is Gauhati Airport. Now Kalgachia is connected with district headquarter Barpeta within 20 minutes with the help of New Beki bridge which is completed 2019.

Notable people
Fakhruddin Ali Ahmed, former president of India.
Abdul Khaleque, MP of Indian Parliament and former MLA of Assam Legislative Assembly.
Rafiqul Islam, MLA of Assam Legislative Assembly.

References

Cities and towns in Barpeta district